Jules Pierre Verreaux (24 August 1807 – 7 September 1873) was a French botanist and ornithologist and a professional collector of and trader in natural history specimens. He was the brother of Édouard Verreaux and nephew of Pierre Antoine Delalande.

Career

Verreaux worked for the family business, Maison Verreaux, established in 1803 by his father, Jacques Philippe Verreaux, at Place des Vosges in Paris, which was the earliest known company that dealt in objects of natural history. The company funded collection expeditions to various parts of the world. Maison Verreaux sold many specimens to the Muséum National d'Histoire Naturelle to add to its collections.

In 1830, while travelling in modern-day Botswana, Verreaux witnessed the burial of a Tswana warrior. Verreaux returned to the burial site under cover of night to dig up the African's body where he retrieved the skin, the skull and a few bones.  Verreaux intended to ship the body back to France and so prepared and preserved the African warrior's corpse by using metal wire as a spine, wooden boards as shoulder blades and newspaper as a stuffing material.  Then he shipped the body to Paris along with a batch of stuffed animals in crates.  In 1831, the African's body appeared in a showroom at No. 3, Rue Saint Fiacre. He was later known as Negro of Banyoles, and was returned and buried in Botswana.

Verreaux travelled to Australia in 1842 to collect plants. He returned to France in 1851 with a natural history collection reported to contain 15,000 items. In 1864 he took over from Florent Prévost as assistant naturalist at the Paris Museum.

Verreaux also worked in China and South Africa, where he helped Andrew Smith found the South African Museum in Cape Town in 1825.

Legacy
He is commemorated in the names of: 
Verreaux's eagle (Aquila verreauxii), 
Verreaux's eagle-owl (Bubo lacteus), 
Verreaux's coua (Coua verreauxi), 
Verreaux's sifaka (Propithecus verreauxi), 
the white-tipped dove (Leptotila verreauxi), 
the golden parrotbill (Paradoxornis verreauxi), 
Verreaux's skink (Anomalopus verreauxii), and the 
Andaman giant gecko (Gekko verreauxi).
The Southern Conger Eel Conger verreauxi  Kaup, 1856 is also named after him.

References

External links

1807 births
1873 deaths
19th-century French zoologists
19th-century naturalists
French naturalists
French ornithologists
French taxonomists
French zoologists